Wellingborough Loco Shed was a stabling point located in Wellingborough, Northamptonshire, England. The depot was situated on the Midland Main Line and was located just north of Wellingborough station.

The depot code is WO.

History 
The sidings at the north end of the loco sheds once served the Finedonhill Tramway a narrow-gauge railway that carried iron ore from quarries to the south of Finedon to the sidings. The tramway was in operation from 1875 to 1926. Another narrow gauge tramway, the Wellingborough Tramway passed under the railway immediately north of the Finedon Road overbridge. This line operated until 1966 and was the last narrow-gauge railway operating in The Midlands iron fields.

Before its closure in 1984, Class 08 shunters, 25, British Rail Class 31, 45 and 46 locomotives, British Rail class 47 could be seen at the depot.

References 

Railway depots in England
Wellingborough